The Military ranks of Luxembourg are the military insignia used by the Luxembourg Army. Luxembourg has an air force but no navy. The insignia is inspired by the British ranks.

Commissioned Officers
The rank insignia of commissioned officers.

Enlisted
The rank insignia of non-commissioned officers and enlisted personnel.

Notes

References

External links
 

Military of Luxembourg